Simms may refer to:

First or middle name 
 Anna Simms Banks (1862–1923), American educator and politician
 E. Simms Campbell (1906–1971), American cartoonist
 Mary Simms Oliphant (1891–1988), American historian
 Simms Taback (1932–2011), American author and illustrator

Last name 
 Aamir Simms (born 1999), American basketball player
 Albert G. Simms (1882–1964), American politician
 Allen Simms (born 1982), American triple jumper and entrepreneur
 Andrew Simms, British writer and political analyst
 Bekah Simms (born 1990), Canadian composer
 Bill Simms (1908–2002), American baseball player
 Bishop Simms (1767–1829), British organist and composer
 Brendan Simms, Irish historian and professor
 Charles Simms (disambiguation), multiple people
 Chris Simms (born 1980), American football player
 Chris Simms (born 1969), British author
 Christel Simms, Filipino-American swimmer
 Clyde Simms (born 1982), American soccer player
 Colin Simms (born 1939), British biologist and poet
 David J. Simms (1933–2018), Irish mathematician and professor
 Dia Simms, American businesswoman
 Edward Simms, (1800–1893), British organist and composer
 Ellis Simms (born 2001), English footballer
 Eric Simms (disambiguation), multiple people
 Ernie Simms (1891–1971), English footballer
 Frederick Simms (disambiguation), multiple people
 George Simms (1910–1991), Irish bishop
 Ginny Simms (1913–1994), American singer and actress
 Gordon Simms (born 1981), British footballer
 Greg Simms, American politician
 Larry Simms (1934–2009), American actor
 Len Simms (born 1943), Canadian politician
 Lise Simms (born 1963), American actress, singer, and dancer
 Lorraine Simms, Canadian painter
 Hal Simms (1919–2002), American television announcer
 Hank Simms (1923–2013), American voice actor
 Harry Simms (disambiguation), multiple people
 Heather Simms (born 1970), American actress
 Henry Simms (c. 1717–1747), English thief
 Henry Simms (1804–1872), English organist and composer
 Herbert George Simms (1898–1948), English architect
 Hilda Simms (1918–1994), American actress
 Jack Simms (born c. 1903), English footballer
 James Simms (disambiguation), multiple people
 Jeptha Root Simms (1807–1883)
 John Simms (disambiguation), multiple people
 Jonathan Simms (1984–2011), Irish disease patient
 Juliet Simms (born 1986), American singer-songwriter
 Justin Simms (born 1973), Canadian filmmaker
 Kenneth Simms (born 1986), American basketball player
 Kevin Simms (born 1964), English rugby union footballer
 Kimberley Simms (born 1963), American actress
 Mabel Robinson Simms (1914–2005), American jazz pianist
 Madeleine Simms (1930–2011), British activist
 Mark Simms (born 1981), Canadian filmmaker and activist
 Margaret Simms (born 1947), American economist
 Margo Simms, known professionally as Margeaux, Canadian singer-songwriter and fashion designer
 Matt Simms (disambiguation), multiple people
 Michael Simms (disambiguation), multiple people
 Mike Simms (born 1967), American baseball player
 Mit Simms (1873–1957), American politician
 Neville Simms (born 1944), British businessman and civil engineer
 Noel Simms (1935–2017), Jamaican musician
 Paul Simms (born 1966), American television writer and producer
 Phil Simms (born 1954), American football player
 Rachael Simms (born 1983), Scottish curler
 Randy Simms, Canadian politician and radio host
 Richard Simms, American politician  
 Robert Simms (disambiguation), multiple people
 Ron Simms, American motorcycle builder
 Royston Simms (1894–1978), English cricketer
 Samuel Simms (disambiguation), multiple people
 Sarah Simms, a fictional character in the DC Universe
 Scott Simms (born 1969), Canadian politician
 Shirley Simms, American singer-songwriter
 Sterling Simms (born 1982), American singer-songwriter
 Steve Simms, Australian rugby league footballer
 Stuart O. Simms (born 1950), American politician
 Thomas Simms (disambiguation), multiple people
 Travis Simms (born 1971), American boxer and politician
 Vic Simms, Australian singer-songwriter
 Wendy Simms, fictional character from CSI: Crime Scene Investigation
 Wesley Simms, co-founder in 1938 of the Redfern All Blacks, an Indigenous Australian rugby league club
 William Simms (disambiguation), multiple people
 Zastrow Simms (1940–2013), American civil rights activist

Places 
 Simms, Montana
 Simms, Oklahoma
 Simms, Texas
 Simms Building, New Mexico's first modern, International Style skyscraper
 Simms Stream, a river in northern New Hampshire in the United States

Other 
 Cooke, Troughton & Simms, a British instrument-making firm
 Troughton & Simms
 Simms Independent School District
 Simms Motor Units Ltd, later Simms Group, a defunct British motor and electronics subsidiary of Lucas Industries

 Simm (hill), a hill in the British Isles that is over 600 m high and has a prominence of at least 30 m
Surnames from given names